The 2007 President's Cup was the 57th season of the President's Cup, a knock-out competition for Maldives' top 4 football clubs. Victory Sports Club are the defending champions, having defeated Club Valencia in last season's final on penalties.

Broadcasting rights
The broadcasting rights for all the matches of 2007 Maldives President's Cup were given to the Television Maldives.

Qualifier
Top 4 teams at the end of 2007 Dhivehi League will be qualified for the President's Cup.

Final qualifier

Semi-final Qualifier

Semi-final

Final

References
 President's Cup 2007 at RSSSF

President's Cup (Maldives)
Pres